Marcel Granollers and Horacio Zeballos were the defending champions from when the tournament was last held in 2019, but withdrew before the tournament began.

Rajeev Ram and Joe Salisbury won the title, defeating Nikola Mektić and Mate Pavić in the final, 6–3, 4–6, [10–3]. By reaching the finals, the Croatian tandem became the second team since the Bryans in 2014, to reach 5 consecutive Masters 1000 finals.

Seeds
The top four seeds receive a bye into the second round.

Draw

Finals

Top half

Bottom half

References

External links
Main draw

Men's Doubles